Willem Zijderveld (1796-1840), was a Dutch painter, was born at Amsterdam. In the Haarlem Museum there is a picture by him representing Jan van Oldenbarnevelt presenting to Arent Meyndertsz Fabricius the silver-gilt cup voted to the latter by the States of Holland for his services at the siege of Ostend. Zijderweld died at Amsterdam, 24 December 1840.

References

1796 births
1840 deaths
Dutch painters
Dutch male painters
Painters from Amsterdam